is a Japanese judoka and Olympic champion. She won a gold medal in the half middleweight division at the 1996 Summer Olympics in Atlanta.

Emoto received a silver medal at the 1994 Asian Games.

She is married to South Korean judoka Kim Hyuk.

In 2016, she provided input to a manga series written by Makoto Kobayashi titled JJM: Joshi Judou-bu Monogatari.

References

1972 births
Living people
Japanese female judoka
Olympic judoka of Japan
Judoka at the 1996 Summer Olympics
Olympic gold medalists for Japan
People from Asahikawa
Olympic medalists in judo
Asian Games medalists in judo
Judoka at the 1994 Asian Games
Medalists at the 1996 Summer Olympics
Asian Games silver medalists for Japan
Medalists at the 1994 Asian Games
20th-century Japanese women
21st-century Japanese women